Ray Sonin (23 June 1907–20 August 1991) was a British-born broadcaster on Toronto radio station CFRB and hosted several popular radio programs, including Calling All Britons and Down Memory Lane.

Life
Born in London on June 23, 1907, he became a reporter at the age of 17.  He wrote several mystery novels prior to World War II, and joined the BBC as a writer in 1940, producing scripts for such personalities as Edward G. Robinson and Noël Coward during the war years.  A substantial pools win allowed Sonin to retire after World War II and work on writing two further mystery novels, and one young adult science fiction novel. Sonin was also a respected composer whose work was recorded by Vera Lynn and Mantovani.

In 1952, Sonin was lured back into journalism with an offer to become the editor of The Musical Express - a weekly publication of four pages which contained the Top Twenty list of the sales of sheet music. This list was used by Radio Luxembourg during the early 1950s for their pioneering Sunday night programme. Under Sonin's editorship, the Musical Express began publishing artist interviews, industry gossip, and compiled a top 20 list based on record sales.  Sales of the magazine jumped by 50%, and when The Musical Express was sold to Odhams the mast head read The 'New' Musical Express.

Ray Sonin emigrated to Canada from London in 1957.  Shortly thereafter, he put his life savings into a Canadian equivalent of The Musical Express called Music World and he lost every cent. But his misfortune with the Canadian music magazine was a blessing to his estimated 100,000 listeners, who tuned into Toronto radio station CFRB 1010 for his program Calling All Britons at 4:10 PM every Saturday for three hours of music, news and sports from the United Kingdom. Down Memory Lane ran on weeknights, and featured music popular in Great Britain during the 1940s and 1950s.

In 1984, Sonin was made a member of the Order of the British Empire at Buckingham Palace by Queen Elizabeth II, an honour that Sonin called, "the greatest moment in my life."  He is also credited with having a great ear for talent. Long before Beatlemania swept the globe he is credited as the first program host in North America to play the Fab Four in the fall or early winter of 1962.

His first wife, Eileen, died in 1977 following 39 years of marriage. Then he met his second wife, June, whom he married at Old City Hall, Toronto in 1978. He had no children.

He died on August 20, 1991 of an apparent heart attack.

Bibliography

Fiction

Non-fiction

References

External links
 Ray Sonin biography at History of Canadian Broadcasting

1907 births
1991 deaths
Canadian radio personalities
British emigrants to Canada